USS Carrillo (ID-1406) was a United States Navy cargo ship in commission from 1918 to 1919.

SS Carrillo was built as a commercial passenger-cargo ship in 1911 at Belfast, Ireland, by Workman, Clark and Company. The United States Shipping Board transferred her to the U.S. Navy for World War I service on 16 September 1918. The Navy assigned her the naval registry Identification Number (Id. No.) 1406 and commissioned her the same day as USS Carrillo.

Assigned to the Cruiser and Transport Force, Carrillo made four voyages to France during and after the war, carrying meats, motor trucks, aviation supplies, and artillery to American forces operating in Europe. On 15 April 1919, she returned to the United States at Staten Island, New York, from the last of these voyages.

Carrillo was decommissioned on 28 April 1919. She was returned to the Shipping Board on 8 May 1919.

The ship returned to commercial service as SS Carrillo, and for over 25 years was employed in commercial trade as part of the United Fruit Companys fleet of refrigerated cargo ships. She was laid up in the Maritime Commissions Hudson River Reserve Fleet in June 1947 and sold for scrapping in March 1948.

References

Department of the Navy: Naval Historical Center Online Library of Selected Images: Civilian Ships: S.S. Carrillo (American Passenger-Cargo Steamship, 1911). Served as USS Carrillo (ID # 1406) in 1918-1919
NavSource Online: Section Patrol Craft Photo Archive: Carrillo (ID 1406)

World War I cargo ships of the United States
Ships built in Belfast
1911 ships
Cargo ships of the United States Navy